Lincoln Park, New Jersey may refer to:

Lincoln Park, New Jersey, a borough in Morris County
Lincoln Park, Edison, New Jersey, a neighborhood in Edison
Lincoln Park (Jersey City), a park in Jersey City
Lincoln Park, Newark, New Jersey, a neighborhood in Newark
Lincoln Park, New Brunswick, New Jersey, a neighborhood in New Brunswick